The South Korea national youth handball team is the national under-18 handball team of South Korea. Controlled by the Korea Handball Federation, that is an affiliate of the International Handball Federation IHF as well as a member of the Asian Handball Federation AHF, The team represents South Korea in international matches.

Statistics

Youth Olympic Games 

 Champions   Runners up   Third place   Fourth place

World Championship record
 Champions   Runners up   Third place   Fourth place

References

External links
World Men's Youth Championship table
European Men's Youth Championship table

Handball in South Korea
Men's national youth handball teams
Handball
Handball